The 2023 War Chamber is an upcoming professional wrestling supercard event produced by Major League Wrestling (MLW), which will take place on April 6, 2023, at the Melrose Ballroom in Queens, New York. It will be the third event under the War Chamber chronology.

Production

Background
War Chamber is a professional wrestling supercard event produced by Major League Wrestling (MLW). The first War Chamber event was held on September 7, 2019, as replacement for MLW WarGames, which was discontinued after WWE acquired the rights to the name of the namesake WarGames match for its NXT brand and their annual NXT WarGames events. On December 2, 2022, MLW announced that War Chamber will take place on April 6, 2023, from the Melrose Ballroom in Queens, New York.

Storylines
The card will consist of matches that result from scripted storylines, where wrestlers portray villains, heroes, or less distinguishable characters in scripted events that built tension and culminated in a wrestling match or series of matches, with results predetermined by MLW's writers. Storylines are played out on MLW's main show, MLW Underground Wrestling, as well as MLW's social media platforms.

Through MLW's "Open Door Policy" several free agents would be signed to compete at the event. Names include former Ring of Honor (ROH) star Mandy Leon and Japanese wrestler Shigehiro Irie.

Matches

References

Major League Wrestling shows
2023 in professional wrestling
April 2023 events in the United States
Professional wrestling in New York City
Events in New York City